Julio Castro (born 27 December 1879, date of death unknown) was a Spanish sports shooter. He competed in the 50 m rifle, prone event at the 1932 Summer Olympics.

References

External links
 

1879 births
Year of death missing
Spanish male sport shooters
Olympic shooters of Spain
Shooters at the 1932 Summer Olympics
20th-century Spanish people